Yadé Kara (Çayırlı, 1965) is a Turkish-German writer.

Born in  Eastern Anatolia, she grew up in West Berlin. She studied English and German studies and also drama at the Schiller Theater. She has worked as an actress, teacher and journalist in cities like London, Istanbul or Hong Kong and published several articles for radio and television.

Her first novel Selam Berlin (2003) won the Deutschen Bücherpreis and the Adelbert-von-Chamisso-Förderpreis in 2004.

Works
Café Cyprus, Roman, Diogenes, Zürich 2008. 375 S. 
Selam Berlin, Roman, Diogenes, Zürich 2003. 381 S.

References

External links 
 
 Interview mit Enno E. Peter vom November 2003

German journalists
Turkish women journalists
German women writers
Turkish women writers

Turkish writers
Turkish emigrants to Germany
1965 births
Living people